Oxyrhopus doliatus, Bibron's false coral snake, is a species of snake in the family Colubridae.  The species is native to Venezuela.

References

Oxyrhopus
Snakes of South America
Reptiles of Venezuela
Endemic fauna of Venezuela
Reptiles described in 1854
Taxa named by André Marie Constant Duméril
Taxa named by Gabriel Bibron
Taxa named by Auguste Duméril